The Federal Identity Program (FIP, PCIM) is the Government of Canada's corporate identity program.  The purpose of the FIP is to provide to the public a consistent and unified image for federal government projects and activities. Other objectives of the program include facilitating public access to federal programs and services, promoting the equal status of the two official languages, and achieving better management of the federal identity.  Managed by the Treasury Board Secretariat, this program, and the government's communication policy, help to shape the public image of the government.  In general, logos – or, in the parlance of the policy, visual identifiers – used by government departments other than those specified in the FIP must be approved by the Treasury Board.

Background 
The origin of the Federal Identity Program can be traced back to 1921 when King George V proclaimed the Royal Coat of Arms, making red and white the official colours of Canada. In 1965, Queen Elizabeth II proclaimed the Canadian flag, and the maple leaf became an official symbol of Canada.

In 1969, the Official Languages Act was established to ensure the equality of English and French in all federal jurisdictions.  That same year, the Task Force on Government Information found that the Canadian government was conveying a confused image to the populace through a hodge-podge of symbology and typefaces (fonts).  In 1970, the FIP was created to standardize a corporate identity for the Canadian government.

Applications

The Federal Identity Program covers approximately 160 institutions and over 20,000 facilities across Canada and worldwide.  Individual departments or agencies can manage their own corporate identity and decide the fields of application based on their mandate and operating needs. The corporate identity can be used either externally in communication with the public, or internally with government employees.  Among the applications are stationery, forms, vehicular markings, signage, advertising, published material, electronic communications, audio-visual productions, candy,  expositions, personnel identification, awards, plaques, packaging, buildings, labelling, and identification of equipment.

Components
There are two basic components of the Federal Identity Program: the Canada wordmark and the corporate signature with one of the two national symbols and a bilingual title, all of which are rendered consistently.

Official and signage colours, including the national colours of Canada, are specified in technical specification T-145 as hexadecimal triplets, RGB values, CMYK colors, and Pantone Color Matching System numbers.

Canada wordmark

The Canada wordmark is mandatory on virtually all of the applications mentioned above.  Established in 1972, the Canada wordmark is essentially a logo for the government of Canada: it consists of the word "Canada" written in a serif font, a modified version of Baskerville, with a Canadian flag over the final 'a'. In a 1999 study commissioned by the federal government, 77% of respondents remembered seeing the Canada wordmark at some point in the past. Television viewers may be familiar with the logo from seeing it in the credits of Canadian television programs, where it is used to indicate government funding or tax credits.

Corporate signatures
There exist two basic types of FIP corporate signatures, each having a bilingual title and one of two official symbols. The title, referred to as an applied title, is used in all communications with the public. Creating or changing an applied title must be approved by the department minister and the President of the Treasury Board. The title is rendered in one of three typefaces of the sans serif Helvetica family, selected for its simplicity and modernity.

 One signature variant, with the national flag symbol, is used to identify all departments, agencies, corporations, commissions, boards, councils, and any other federal body and activity.  In such signatures, the flag typically appears to the left of a bilingual title (see first image above). When the FIP was first implemented, a similar signature without the pale on the flag's 'fly' (right) was used until 1987 (see second image above).
 The other variant, with the Coat of Arms of Canada, is used to identify ministers and their offices, parliamentary secretaries, institutions whose heads report directly to Parliament, and institutions with quasi-judicial functions. When applied within the context of the FIP, the coat of arms is often flanked on each side by an official's or department's bilingual title. Use of the coat of arms, instead of the flag signature, requires authorization by the appropriate minister with agreement of the President of the Treasury Board.

Use of other symbols 
Other symbols can be used together with the FIP symbols, except on standard applications such as stationery, signage and vehicle markings.

Exemptions
Certain federal entities were listed as exempt from FIP in the 1990 FIP Policy:

Atlantic Canada Opportunities Agency
Atomic Energy of Canada Limited
Bank of Canada
Canada Council
Canada Development Investment Corporation
Canada Labour Relations Board
Canada Lands Company Limited
Canada Lands Company Limited
Canada Lands Company Inc.
Canada Lands Company (Mirabel) Limited
Canada Mortgage and Housing Corporation
Canada Ports Corporation
Canada Post Corporation
Canadian Armed Forces
Canadian Broadcasting Corporation
Canadian Centre for Management Development
Canadian Centre for Occupational Health and Safety
Canadian Commercial Corporation
Canadian General Standards Board
Canadian Human Rights Commission
Canadian Intergovernmental Conference Secretariat
Canadian National Railway Company (privatized in 1995)
Canadian Patents and Development Limited
Canadian Saltfish Corporation
Canadian Wheat Board
CORCAN (industrial work program of Correctional Service Canada)
Economic Council of Canada
Enterprise Cape Breton Corporation
Export Development Corporation
Federal Business Development Bank
Freshwater Fish Marketing Corporation
Halifax Port Corporation
Harbourfront Corporation
House of Commons
International Centre for Ocean Development
Judicial branch
Language Training Canada (component of the Public Service Commission of Canada)
Marine Atlantic Inc.
Montreal Port Corporation
National Arts Centre Corporation
National Capital Commission
National Film Board
National Round Table on the Environment and the Economy
Office of the Secretary to the Governor General of Canada
Petro-Canada (privatized in 1991)
Port Metro Vancouver
Port of Quebec Corporation
Prince Rupert Port Corporation
Public Service Staff Relations Board
Royal Canadian Mint
Royal Canadian Mounted Police
Saint John Port Corporation
Science Council of Canada
Senate of Canada
Standards Council of Canada
St. John's Port Corporation
St. Lawrence Seaway Authority
Via Rail Canada Inc.

References

External links
Federal Identity Program Manual

Government of Canada
National symbols of Canada
Logos
Brand management
1970 in Canadian politics